Zuralmy Coromoto Rivas Molina (born 26 November 1993) is a Venezuelan track and road cyclist. In 2013, she won bronze at the Bolivarian Games in the team sprint. In 2014, she won the Clasico FVCiclismo Corre Por la VIDA.

Major results

2013
 2nd Team pursuit, Copa Cuba de Pista (with Danielys García, Jennifer Cesar and Fanny Alvarez)
 3rd  Team sprint, Bolivarian Games
2014
 1st Clasico FVCiclismo Corre Por la VIDA
 Copa Venezuela
2nd Scratch
3rd Individual pursuit
3rd Omnium
3rd 500m time trial
 3rd  Team pursuit, Pan American Track Cycling Championships (with Jennifer Cesar, Lilibeth Chacón and Angie González)
 8th Copa Federación Venezolana de Ciclismo
2015
 Copa Venezuela
1st Points race
1st Scratch
 7th Clasico FVCiclismo Corre Por la VIDA
2016
 1st  Road race, National Road Championships
 Copa Venezuela
1st Individual pursuit
3rd Scratch
 9th Copa Federación Venezolana de Ciclismo
 10th Clasico FVCiclismo Corre Por la VIDA
2017
 Bolivarian Games
2nd  Team pursuit
3rd  Scratch
2019
 3rd Road race, National Road Championships
 10th Tour Femenino de Venezuela I

References

External links

1993 births
Venezuelan female cyclists
Living people
Place of birth missing (living people)
Cyclists at the 2015 Pan American Games
Pan American Games competitors for Venezuela
21st-century Venezuelan women